HD 70573 is a variable star in the equatorial constellation of Hydra. At a mean apparent visual magnitude of +8.7, this yellow-hued star is too dim to be visible to the naked eye. Based upon parallax measurements, it is located at a distance of 193 light years from the Sun, and is drifting further away with a radial velocity of 20.5 km/s. It is a candidate member of the proposed Hercules-Lyra Association of co-moving stars, although this membership is disputed.

This is a G-type main-sequence star with a stellar classification of G1/2V. It is a BY Draconis variable that ranges in brightness from magnitude 8.66 down to 8.77 with a rotationally-modulated period of 3.296 days. HD 70573 is generally considered to be a young star although estimates of its age vary from 60 million years to several billion years.  It has a projected rotational velocity of 15 km/s and about the same mass, size, and luminosity as the Sun.

Planetary system
On March 19, 2007, an extrasolar planet was announced, having been discovered by the radial velocity method. As of 2007, this was the youngest host star discovered to have an orbiting planet. However, a follow-up study by Soto et al. in 2015 failed to detect the planetary signal, so it remains unconfirmed.

The system displays an infrared excess, which matches the black body signature of a debris disk orbiting  from the host star with a mean temperature of 60 K.

References

External links
 

G-type main-sequence stars
BY Draconis variables
Circumstellar disks
Hypothetical planetary systems

Hydra (constellation)
Durchmusterung objects
070573
Hydrae, V478